Hinea lineata, common name the dwarf Atlantic planaxis, is a species of sea snail, a marine gastropod mollusk in the family Planaxidae.

Distribution
This species occurs in the following locations:
 Atlantic Ocean : Angola, Cape Verdes, West Africa, St. Helena
 Gulf of Mexico
 Caribbean Sea
 Lesser Antilles

Description 
The maximum recorded shell length is 10 mm.

The very small shell is ovate, conical, smooth, and diaphanous. It is colored with white, elegantly ornamented upon its whole surface with pretty numerous, narrow, transverse lines, of a blackish brown. The spire is composed of six slightly convex whorls. The body whorl is inflated, and larger than all the others united. The linear suture is very fine. The aperture is subrounded, of violet color and within are perceived the external colored lines. The outer is lip simple, thin and sharp. Its edge is expanded and marked with brown lines. The columella is smooth and arcuated.

Habitat 
Minimum recorded depth is 0 m. Maximum recorded depth is 48 m.

References

 Bernard, P.A. (Ed.) (1984). Coquillages du Gabon [Shells of Gabon]. Pierre A. Bernard: Libreville, Gabon. 140, 75 plates 
 Gofas, S.; Afonso, J.P.; Brandào, M. (Ed.). (S.a.). Conchas e Moluscos de Angola = Coquillages et Mollusques d'Angola. [Shells and molluscs of Angola]. Universidade Agostinho / Elf Aquitaine Angola: Angola. 140 pp
  Rolán E., 2005. Malacological Fauna From The Cape Verde Archipelago. Part 1, Polyplacophora and Gastropoda
 Rosenberg, G., F. Moretzsohn, and E. F. García. 2009. Gastropoda (Mollusca) of the Gulf of Mexico, Pp. 579–699 in Felder, D.L. and D.K. Camp (eds.), Gulf of Mexico–Origins, Waters, and Biota. Biodiversity. Texas A&M Press, College Station, Texas

External links
 Da Costa, Mendes E. (1778). Historia naturalis testaceorum Britanniæ, or, the British conchology; containing the descriptions and other particulars of natural history of the shells of Great Britain and Ireland: illustrated with figures. In English and French. - Historia naturalis testaceorum Britanniæ, ou, la conchologie Britannique; contenant les descriptions & autres particularités d'histoire naturelle des coquilles de la Grande Bretagne & de l'Irlande: avec figures en taille douce. En anglois & françois., i-xii, 1-254, i-vii, [1, Pl. I-XVII. London. (Millan, White, Emsley & Robson).,]
 da Costa E. M. (1778). Historia Naturalis Testaceorum Britanniae, or, The British Conchology. London: Millan, White, Elmsley & Robson. xii + 254 + viii pp. 17 pls
 Smith, E. A. (1872). A list of the species of the genus Planaxis, with descriptions of eleven new species. Annals and Magazine of Natural History. ser. 4, 9: 37-47.
 

Planaxidae
Gastropods described in 1778
Taxa named by Emanuel Mendes da Costa
Molluscs of the Atlantic Ocean
Molluscs of Angola
Gastropods of Cape Verde